Sir Henry Campbell de la Poer Beresford-Peirse, 5th Baronet, CB, FRSE (24 April 1905 – 11 August 1972) was a British civil servant.

Born on 24 April 1905, he was the son of Sir Henry Bernard de la Poer Beresford-Peirse, 4th Baronet (1875–1949), and his wife Lady Mabel Marjorie Campbell (1876–1966). After attending Eton College, he studied at Magdalen College, Oxford, graduating in 1927 with a BA and in 1929 with a BSc in forestry. He inherited the baronetcy from his father in 1949.

Beresford-Peirse entered the Forestry Commission in 1931 as a district officer. After serving in the Second World War, he was appointed Director of Forestry for Scotland in 1947 (succeeding Arthur Gosling); he served in that office until 1953, when he succeeded W. H. Guillebaud as Deputy Director-General of the Forestry Commission (he was succeeded by A. H. H. Ross in Scotland). From 1960 to 1962, he was seconded as Deputy Director of the Forestry Division of the UN Food and Agriculture Organization (with James Macdonald acting for him at the Forestry Commission in his absence). In 1962, he was appointed Director-General of the Forestry Commission, succeeding Sir Arthur Gosling. Macdonald took over his position as Deputy Director-General. In 1965, Beresford-Peirse was also appointed Deputy Chairman of the Commission, holding both offices until he retired in 1968. He died on 11 August 1972 and his baronetcy was inherited by his son, Henry. He had been appointed a Companion of the Order of the Bath (CB) in the 1957 New Year Honours and received the Gold Medal of the Royal Forestry Society in 1963. He was elected a Fellow of the Royal Society of Edinburgh (FRSE) in 1952.

References 

1905 births
1972 deaths
British civil servants
Alumni of Magdalen College, Oxford
Companions of the Order of the Bath
Fellows of the Royal Society of Edinburgh
People educated at Eton College